The 1947 Turkish Football Championship was the 13th edition of the competition. It was held in May. Ankara Demirspor won their first and only national championship title by winning the Final Group in Ankara undefeated.

The champions of the Istanbul and Ankara regional leagues qualified directly for the Final Group. Adana Demirspor qualified by winning the qualification play-off, which was contested by the winners of the regional qualification groups. The İzmir champions did not participate this year.

Final group

See also
1947 Turkish National Division
1947 Prime Minister's Cup

References

External links
RSSSF

Turkish Football Championship seasons
Turkish
Turkey